Alfred Edward Maybury (born 1877; date of death unknown) was an English footballer who played as a goalkeeper for Nantwich, Burslem Port Vale, and Chesterfield.

Career
Maybury played non-league football with Nantwich, before joining Burslem Port Vale in May 1900. On his debut, on 8 September, he conceded six goals in a 6–1 drubbing by Grimsby Town at Blundell Park. Despite this poor start he was an ever-present for the rest of the season, before being released from the Athletic Ground upon its conclusion. He had played 32 Second Division games, one FA Cup game and two other cup games. He then moved on to Chesterfield. He later played for Crewe Alexandra.

Career statistics
Source:

References

1877 births
Year of death missing
People from Nantwich
English footballers
Association football goalkeepers
Nantwich Town F.C. players
Port Vale F.C. players
Chesterfield F.C. players
Crewe Alexandra F.C. players
English Football League players